NGC 3268 is an elliptical galaxy in the constellation Antlia. It was discovered on April 18, 1835 by the astronomer John Herschel.

References

Antlia
Elliptical galaxies
3268
18350418
Antlia Cluster
030949